The National Archives of Venezuela are in Caracas.

See also 
 List of national archives
 List of archives in Venezuela

References 

For more information see the Spanish version of this page :es:Archivo General de la Nación de Venezuela

External links 
 http://www.agn.gob.ve

Venezuela
Venezuelan culture
Archives in Venezuela